The Dusia lake is the largest lake in Southern Lithuania, Lazdijai district and is part of the Dovinė River basin. Other nearby lakes are  Lake Metelys and Lake Obelija.

In winter of 1954 lake Dusia the ice coverage as thick as 78 cm.

Dusia lake accommodates 18 different breeds of fish.

References 

Dusia
Tourist attractions in Alytus County